A list of Spanish-produced and co-produced feature films released in the country in 2004. The domestic theatrical release date is favoured.

Films

Box office 
The five highest-grossing Spanish films in 2004, by domestic box office gross revenue, are as follows:

See also 
 19th Goya Awards

Informational notes

References

External links
 Spanish films of 2004 at the Internet Movie Database

2004
Spanish
Films